Jozef Skvašík (born 8 September 1991) is a Slovak professional footballer who plays as a midfielder for MFK Snina.

Career
In January 2019, Skvašík joined FK Humenné.

References

External links
 
 Futbalnet profile 
 MFK Košice profile 

1991 births
Living people
Slovak footballers
Association football midfielders
FC VSS Košice players
MFK Lokomotíva Zvolen players
MFK Snina players
FK Humenné players
Slovak Super Liga players
People from Snina
Sportspeople from the Prešov Region